Kızıldam can refer to:

 Kızıldam, Aladağ
 Kızıldam, Lapseki
 Kızıldam, Yenice